Andrew Peterson (born December 2, 1984) is a former American soccer player, currently retired.

Career

Youth and College
Peterson attended for Wayzata High School in Plymouth, Minnesota, from 1999 to 2003, where he was an All-Conference and All-State player his senior year. Peterson played four years of college soccer for Creighton University, starting over 80 games while claiming numerous all tournament awards, a 2nd Team All Midwest his junior year and 2nd Team All Conference in his senior year.

Professional
Peterson was drafted in the first round of the 2007 USL Draft by the Minnesota Thunder of the a USL First Division. However, instead of playing for Minnesota Thunder, Peterson decided to train as a Christian missionary with the Cleveland City Stars in the USL Second Division. Through the efforts of his Cleveland coach, Martin Rennie, and general manager Aaron Treadway, they arranged for him to play in a May reserve game for the Columbus Crew against the Chicago Fire in which the Columbus Crew team won 1–0. As a result of this tryout, the Crew asked offered Peterson a developmental contract in July 2007. His first game with the Crew was against the Colorado Rapids on July 4, 2007.

On March 4, 2009, the Minnesota Thunder announced the signing of Peterson for the 2009 season.

References

External links
 Minnesota Thunder bio
 MLS player profile
 Peterson's blog

Living people
1984 births
Sportspeople from Edina, Minnesota
American soccer players
Creighton Bluejays men's soccer players
Major League Soccer players
USL First Division players
Cleveland City Stars players
Columbus Crew players
Minnesota Thunder players
Association football defenders
Soccer players from Minnesota